Mark Laubach is an electrical engineer with Broadcom Corporation in Irvine, California. He was named a Fellow of the Institute of Electrical and Electronics Engineers (IEEE) in 2016 for his leadership in the design and standardization of cable modems.

References

Fellow Members of the IEEE
Living people
Year of birth missing (living people)
Place of birth missing (living people)
American electrical engineers